Pietà with Two Angels is an oil on copper painting by Annibale Carracci, created c. 1603, now in the Kunsthistorisches Museum in Vienna. 

A letter by the doctor and art lover Giulio Mancini refers to his receiving a painting directly from Annibale Carracci as a reward for medical treatment in 1607, at which time the painter was also affected by the illness which led to his death soon afterwards. This is often identified with the Vienna work, which for stylistic reasons is dated to 1603. If that identification is accepted, it can further be deduced that Annibale had painted the work for himself rather than as a direct commission and was given to the doctor in gratitude or since he had no other way to pay his medical bills.

The first definite mention of the work dates to 1659 and it appears below the large landscapes at the centre of David Teniers the Younger's Gallery of Archduke Leopold William in Brussels, which reproduces the most famous works in that collection, mostly by Italian painters and gathered by Archduke Leopold William whilst governor in Brussels and later taken to Vienna.

References

Paintings by Annibale Carracci
Paintings in the collection of the Kunsthistorisches Museum
Carracci
Angels in art
1603 paintings